Mala leche is a 2004 Chilean movie, directed by León Errázuriz. It won the Horizons Award at 52nd San Sebastián International Film Festival.

Plot
The story revolves around two young delinquent friends who are involved in a drug business that goes awry. Their troubles escalate when they lose both the money and the drugs, putting them at risk of being killed by the drug dealer. In order to retrieve the money and avoid being harmed, they embark on a series of crimes within a tight two-day timeframe. The film offers a fresh and realistic perspective of Santiago that differs from the typical postcard-perfect image often portrayed.

Cast
Mauricio Diocares
Luis Dubó 
Tamara Garea 
Adela Secall 
José Herrera 
Loreto Moya 
Ramón Llao 
Camila Leiva

See also 
 Cinema of Chile

External links
 IMDb
 
 Web Mala Leche
 San Sebastian
 Jaman

2004 films
2000s Spanish-language films
Chilean drama films